The BUL Cherokee is a polymer framed semi-automatic pistol made by Israeli firearms manufacturer BUL Transmark and is based on the Czech-designed CZ 75.  It is the successor to the BUL Storm.  The Cherokee is equipped with a tactical rail (for lights, etc.), three-dot windage adjustable sights (night sights optional), and enlarged trigger guard, frame-mounted thumb safety and half-cock safety; no magazine safety.    The frame is an injected, fiber-reinforced polymer construction.  The barrel and slide are forged 18CrMo4 and 34NiCrMo6, respectively.    The new models have a natural grip angle (104 degrees).     Chambered only in the 9mm Parabellum (aka 9mm Luger or 9×19mm).

References

 Manufacturer's "Owner's Manual for BUL Cherokee, G-Cherokee & Storm Double-Action Line of Pistols".
Manufacturer Website for BUL Cherokee
BUL Cherokee at Modern Firearms & Ammunition

External links
Manufacturer Website for BUL Cherokee
BUL Cherokee at Modern Firearms & Ammunition

Semi-automatic pistols of Israel
9mm Parabellum semi-automatic pistols